Sylvia Štefková (born 9 March 1970) is a Czech former professional tennis player. She is the mother of WTA Tour player Barbora Štefková.

Štefková competed on the professional tour from the late 1980s to early 1990s. All of her WTA Tour main draw appearances came in doubles, across 1993 and 1994. Her best performance came at Kitzbühel in 1993, where she and Eva Martincová upset second seeds Florencia Labat and Virginia Ruano Pascual to make the quarter-finals.

ITF finals

Singles: 3 (2–1)

Doubles: 7 (4–3)

References

External links
 
 

1970 births
Living people
Czechoslovak female tennis players
Czech female tennis players